Pieter Desmet (born 7 June 1983 in Kortrijk) is a Belgian steeplechase and long-distance runner. He is a two-time national champion for his category, and a member of Atletiek Zuid-West Club in Zwevegem, being coached and trained by Dirk de Maesschulck. He also achieved a personal best time of 8:15.02, at a world meeting in Heusden-Zolder, Belgium.

Desmet represented Belgium at the 2008 Summer Olympics in Beijing, and competed for the men's 3000 m steeplechase. He ran in the third heat of the event, against twelve other competitors, including South Africa's Ruben Ramolefi, and Kenya's Richard Mateelong. He finished and completed the race in eleventh place, with a time of 8:37.99, failing to advance into the final round.

Desmet also improved his time of 8:31.81 at the 2009 IAAF World Championships in Berlin, Germany, finishing ninth in the heats.

Personal bests

All information taken from IAAF profile.

References

External links
Profile – Flemish Athletics League 

NBC 2008 Olympics profile

Belgian male steeplechase runners
Belgian male long-distance runners
Living people
Olympic athletes of Belgium
Athletes (track and field) at the 2008 Summer Olympics
Sportspeople from Kortrijk
1983 births